Birasal Airstrip, also known as Dhenkanal Airstrip, is located 53 km from the Dhenkanal city center in central Odisha, India. Nearest airport to this airstrip is Biju Patnaik International Airport in the capital city Bhubaneswar i.e. 134 km.

Gati 
The Government Aviation Training Institute (GATI) has operated a flying school base from the airstrip since 2019.

References

Airports in Odisha
Airports with year of establishment missing
Dhenkanal district